Shipton may refer to:

Places
Shipton, Gloucestershire
Shipton, North Yorkshire
Shipton, Shropshire
Shipton Bellinger, Hampshire
Shipton Brook, Buckinghamshire
Shipton Gorge, Dorset
Shipton Lee, Buckinghamshire
Shipton-on-Cherwell, Oxfordshire
Shiptonthorpe, East Riding of Yorkshire
Shipton-under-Wychwood, Oxfordshire
Shipton, Quebec, a former municipality that is now part of Danville, Quebec
Shipton, Kansas, a community in the U.S.

Other
Shipton (surname)
Shipton Hall, an historic house in Shropshire